The Baden Racing Stuten-Preis, race as T von Zastrow Stutenpreis is a Group 2 flat horse race in Germany open to thoroughbred fillies and mares aged three years or older. It is run at Baden-Baden over a distance of 2,400 metres (about 1 mile and 4 furlongs), and it is scheduled to take place each year in August or September.

History
The event was formerly staged at Bremen, and it used to be called the Grosser Stutenpreis von Bremen. For a period it held Listed status, and it was promoted to Group 3 level in 2004. The race distance was increased from 2,200 metres to 2,400 metres and promoted to Group 2 level in 2015.

The race was renamed in memory of Walther J. Jacobs (1907–1998), the founder of the successful stud farm Gestüt Fährhof, in 2005. It continued as the Walther J. Jacobs-Stutenpreis until 2010.

The event was transferred to Baden-Baden in 2011. It was initially promoted as the Badener Diana-Revanche, but was subsequently renamed the Stuten-Preis von Baden. It became known as the Baden Racing Stuten-Preis in 2012.

The title "Walther J. Jacobs-Stutenpreis" is currently assigned to a different race, a Listed event at Bremen over 7 furlongs.

Records
Most successful horse:
 no horse has won this race more than once since 1998

Leading jockey:
 no jockey has won this race more than once since 1998

Leading trainer since 1998 (2 wins):
 Hans Blume – Intuition (1998), Wellanca (1999)
 Harro Remmert – Moonlady (2000), Uriah (2002)
 Horst Steinmetz – Nicara (2001), Royal Fantasy (2003)
 Mark Johnston – Majounes Song (2007), Lady Jane Digby (2009)

Winners since 1998

 Superstition finished first in 2010, but she was relegated to second place following a stewards' inquiry.

See also
 List of German flat horse races

References

 Racing Post / siegerlisten.com:
 1998, 1999, 2000, 2001, 2002, 2003, 
 galopp-sieger.de – Walther J. Jacobs-Stutenpreis.
 horseracingintfed.com – International Federation of Horseracing Authorities – Baden Racing Stuten-Preis (2012).
 pedigreequery.com – Walther J. Jacobs-Stutenpreis – Bremen.

Middle distance horse races for fillies and mares
Horse races in Germany
Sport in Baden-Württemberg
Breeders' Cup Challenge series